Mirko Stefani (born 25 January 1984) is an Italian football coach and former player who played as a defender.

Stefani has played once in Serie A and over 100 matches in Serie C2.

He is currently in charge as head coach of  club Pordenone.

Playing career

Early career
Born in Borgo Valsugana, Trentino, Stefani started his professional career with A.C. Milan of Lombardy, at first as a midfielder. He played his first and only match for A.C. Milan first team on 24 May 2003, the last Serie A match of the season and the match before 2003 UEFA Champions League Final and 2003 Coppa Italia Final. He was substituted at halftime with Mattia Dal Bello, Milan already losing 1–3 at that time.

In summer 2003, he was included in a 6-men swap deal with Parma—Stefani along with Marco Donadel and Davide Favaro, exchanged with Luca Ferretti, Roberto Massaro and Filippo Porcari.

He was immediately loaned to Prato of Serie C1. Although Stefani returned to Parma in January 2004, he did not play any match. In June 2004 Parma bought Favaro and Stefani outright; Milan bought back Donadel, bought Ferretti and Porcari outright; Massaro deal was renewed.

Stefani left for Bellaria Igea Marina of Serie C2 in 2004–05 season, where he played as a regular starter.

Reggiana
Reggiana signed him in a co-ownership deal in 2005. Stefani played 3 out of 4 promotion playoffs in summer 2007. Although Reggiana failed to win, the club bought all remain registration rights from Parma, along with Marco Fanna.

In 2010, he left for Cremonese in temporary deal.

Frosinone
On 18 August 2011 Stefani left for Frosinone Calcio in 3-year deal.

Italian football scandal
On 18 June 2012 he was banned 4 years for involvement in 2011–12 Italian football scandal. In April 2013 the ban was reduced to 13 months after the appeal was partially accepted by the Tribunale Nazionale di Arbitrato per lo Sport (TNAS) of CONI.

Real Vicenza
In summer 2013 he was signed by Real Vicenza V.S.

Messina
In summer 2014 he was signed by A.C.R. Messina.

Pordenone 
On 24 July 2015 he was signed by Pordenone.

International career
At international level he was capped for the Italy national under-16 team at the 2001 UEFA European Under-16 Football Championship and for the Italy under-19 team at the 2003 UEFA European Under-19 Football Championship.

Coaching career
On 6 March 2023, after having served as youth coach in charge of Pordenone Under-17, Stefani was appointed new head coach of the first team in the Serie C league.

Honours
Reggiana
Serie C2: 2008

References

External links
Profile at Reggiana 

Profile at Football.it 
Profile at FIGC 
Profile at FIGC 

Italian footballers
A.C. Milan players
Parma Calcio 1913 players
A.C. Prato players
A.C. Bellaria Igea Marina players
A.C. Reggiana 1919 players
U.S. Cremonese players
Frosinone Calcio players
A.C.R. Messina players
Pordenone Calcio players
Serie A players
Serie C players
Italy youth international footballers
Association football defenders
Italian football managers
Serie C managers
Pordenone Calcio managers
People from Borgo Valsugana
Sportspeople from Trentino
1984 births
Living people
Footballers from Trentino-Alto Adige/Südtirol